Ectinocera borealis is a species of fly in the family Sciomyzidae. It is found in the Palearctic.

References

Sciomyzidae
Insects described in 1838